Daylight is a 1996 American action thriller disaster film directed by Rob Cohen and starring Sylvester Stallone, Amy Brenneman, Viggo Mortensen, Dan Hedaya, Stan Shaw, Jay O. Sanders, Karen Young and Danielle Harris. The film was released by Universal Pictures on December 6, 1996, in the United States, and on December 26 in the United Kingdom. It received mixed reviews and grossed $159 million worldwide.

Plot
In upstate New York, a waste management firm loads barrels of toxic waste onto trucks, intending to illegally dispose of them at a site in New Jersey. They are shown heading into a tunnel beneath the Hudson River along with several commuters, including struggling playwright Maddy Thompson, a bus of juvenile offenders, a vacationing family, an elderly couple with a dog, and sporting goods retailer Roy Nord. Meanwhile, a gang of grunges grabs gems from a gem buyer after mugging him and takes his car to escape the NYPD by racing into the tunnel. The gang force their way through the north tube traffic where the driver loses control and smashes through a security booth and into one of the trucks, causing it to detonate, and resulting in a sympathetic detonation of the remaining trucks. The tunnel entrances cave in, and a devastating fireball sweeps through the tunnel, incinerating the majority of the motorists within it.

About to enter the Manhattan end of the tunnel, former New York City Emergency Medical Services Chief Kit Latura, now working as a taxi driver, witnesses the fireball erupting from the entrance. While racing to help whoever he can, he runs into an old EMS colleague who tells him that the tunnel is severely damaged and could collapse if any wrong moves are made. Kit then checks with tunnel administrators and finds that most of the old exits have been sealed off or are considered unsafe. Kit makes his way into the tunnel through the ventilation system, risking his life as the massive fans can only be slowed down for a short time.

A group of survivors band around Nord, who believes he can find a way out through the mid-river passage, a service corridor running between the north and south tubes. Kit arrives and warns Nord that the passage could come down at any moment, but Nord dismisses the possibility. Kit barely escapes as the passage collapses, killing Nord and causing another explosion which kills a juvenile offender.

Water begins seeping in from the river above, and Kit uses an explosive to stop the leak. Police officer George Tyrell returns from investigating the Manhattan end and is crushed under a truck as the road shifts. The group manages to free him before he can drown, but he is left with a broken neck. The water level continues to rise, and the angry survivors confront Kit. He claims he can slow it down but not stop it, as the clean-up effort on the Manhattan side of the tunnel is causing water to enter their side. Kit recalls that there are sleeping quarters beside the tunnels (leftover from the tunnel's construction) and asks George how to access them. Kit finds one by swimming under a security booth and leads the group to this area, but George has to be left behind. He gives Kit a bracelet intended for his girlfriend Grace and tells him to "get them to daylight."

Eleanor, one of the elderly survivors, is distressed that her late son's dog Cooper is missing. She refuses to go on, then suddenly yet quietly passes away, presumably from hypothermia. The group moves to another room as the first one floods, convincing Eleanor's husband Roger to come with them. As they reach the top of an old wooden staircase, Kit notices Cooper swimming in the water below and dives down to rescue him, passing him up to one of the survivors, but a beam falls and destroys the lower half, sending Kit into the water. Maddy tries to help Kit up, but she falls as well, as more of the staircase is knocked down. Kit orders the rest of the group to leave. The majority of the group escape through a manhole into daylight while the corridor caves in behind them, leaving Kit and the hysterical Maddy behind in the rising water.

Kit and Maddy swim around looking for a possible way out, with the main highway tunnel now almost completely submerged. Kit realizes he will have to use his explosives to cause a "blow out" and rip the tunnel roof open. A mass of mud crushes Kit and Maddy tries to pull him out. The blast forces Maddy towards the surface, but Kit gets stuck in the mud. Maddy finds a barely conscious Kit and keeps him afloat as a boat discovers them offshore. Lying on a stretcher, Kit sees Grace in the crowd and hands her George's bracelet. Maddy insists on riding with him in the ambulance to which Kit replies, "On one condition: We gotta take the bridge."

Cast

Production

Release

Home media

The film was released by MCA/Universal Home Video on VHS & LaserDisc with a digital DTS soundtrack on May 20, 1997. 
The film was also released on DVD on 26 May 1998 with extra features including the movies trailer as well as language selections and a director's commentary.

Reception

Box office
Daylight opened in 2,175 theaters in North America, during which it grossed $10 million. After 55 weeks, the film earned $33 million in the US and $126.2 million internationally for a total of $159.2 million.

Critical response
The film has a 26% approval rating on Rotten Tomatoes based on 42 reviews and an average rating of 4.9 out of 10. The critical consensus reads: "The opening's got a great fiery explosion and Stallone puts in another earnest, sympathetic performance, but all else in Daylight feels designed to annoy the audience into submission."

There were, however, some moderate and positive reviews. Roger Ebert gave the film two stars out of four, commenting, "Daylight is the cinematic equivalent of a golden oldies station, where you never encounter anything you haven't grown to love over the years. At one point, when a trapped civilian asks him if they have a chance, I expected him to say, 'Calm down, lady. I've done this in a dozen other movies.'" Empire gave the film four stars out of five, stating, "Daylight is great because it never tries to be any more than it is — a disaster movie with all the special-effects hoopla the '90s can bring." Randy Edelman's musical score was also praised.

Audiences polled by CinemaScore gave the film an average grade of "B" on an A+ to F scale.

About the film, Stallone simply said: "The premise was really good, but it didn't deliver".

Accolades
The film won a Golden Reel Award for best Sound Editing and was nominated for an Academy Award in the same category (Richard L. Anderson and David A. Whittaker). It was also nominated for two Golden Raspberry Awards, Worst Actor (Sylvester Stallone) and Worst Original Song (Whenever There Is Love). For the 1996 Stinkers Bad Movie Awards, Stallone was nominated for Worst Actor too.
The movie was famous for introducing the Panerai special line of watches (Panerai Daylight) by the request of Stallone himself.

Other media

Novelization
A novelization based on the film by Max Allen Collin titled Daylight, was released in 1996.

References

External links
 
 
 
 
 

1990s disaster films
1996 action thriller films
1996 films
American action thriller films
American disaster films
Davis Entertainment films
Disaster action films
Disaster thriller films
Films directed by Rob Cohen
Films produced by John Davis
Films set in New Jersey
Films set in New York City
Films shot at Cinecittà Studios
Films shot in New Jersey
Films scored by Randy Edelman
Universal Pictures films
1990s English-language films
1990s American films